Longquanyi District is one of 11 urban districts of the prefecture-level city of Chengdu, the capital of Sichuan Province, Southwest China, covering parts of the southeastern suburbs. The population is over 
half a million. It borders the prefecture-level city of Ziyang to the southeast. Longquanyi has been designated as a high-tech development district, with investment mainly focused in the urban areas.

Many hillsides that have been used to farm will be converted by the local government to forest areas, as the district finds tourism more profitable than trying to grow crops on mountainsides.

Tourism
Longquanyi district is one of the most popular places to travel in Sichuan. Half of the area is mountainous with most of the land devoted to peach orchards. In spring, the mountains take on the pink glory of peach blossoms. Longquanyi District is also the home of all kinds of fruits. Famous fruits include grapes, peaches and Loquat fruit.

Climate

Education
Longquanyi district is to home to the "Golden Phoenix" project – where junior high school students get free housing, school uniforms and a food allowance, and attend an urban boarding school.

As of November 2007, more than 3,000 students have already moved from their mountain villages to the city for their educations, almost two-thirds of them subsidized by the government. The district government has already spent 14.5 million yuan on the project, and will spend another 160 million.

Forty-two percent of the district is located in the poor, mountainous parts of Sichuan province. In 2006, all middle schools and high schools located in the poor regions were closed down, and the students transferred to central, urban schools. Many of the students' parents moved to town as well, and took jobs in the city.

References

External links
[http://www.longquanyi.gov.cn/ Government website

Districts of Chengdu